Viorel Vișan (born 21 January 1952) is a Romanian former footballer and manager. He scored Politehnica's first goal in the 2–1 victory against Steaua București in the 1979–1980 Cupa României final.

Honours
CFR Cluj
Divizia B: 1968–69
Politehnica Timișoara
Cupa României: 1979–80

References

External links

Viorel Vișan player profile at Labtof.ro

Living people
Romanian footballers
Association football defenders
1952 births
Liga I players
Liga II players
CFR Cluj players
FC Politehnica Timișoara players
FC CFR Timișoara players
Romanian football managers
FC Politehnica Timișoara managers
CSM Reșița managers